James (? – 1700) was 3-time Ecumenical Patriarch of Constantinople (1679–1682, 1685–1686, 1687–1688). He was previously bishop of Larissa.

Bibliography
 Sylwetka na stronie Patriarchatu Konstantynopolitańskiego

1700 deaths
17th-century Ecumenical Patriarchs of Constantinople
Bishops of Larissa